John B. Murray may refer to:

John B. Murray (general) (1822–1884), American general
John B. Murray (filmmaker), Australian filmmaker
John Bunion Murray (1908–1988), self-taught artist in Glascock County, Georgia

See also 
John Murray (disambiguation)